I soferina (Greek: , The Chauffeur Lady) is a 1964 Greek theatrical comedy film directed by Giorgos Roussos, The Last Joke (Το Τελευταίο Ψέμα = To Telefteo Psema).  The movie was released into cinemas the same as To doloma was released which it had the same protagonistic twin, but with a different company.

The movie acted together for the first and only time in two great star, Aliki Vougiouklaki and Maro Kontou.

Plot

The film opens with Michalis (Giorgos Konstantinou) searching for his wife at a salon, where he is told his wife is not there and is forced to leave for disturbing the customers. He drops by a gathering of her friends, where he is told she declined attending to tend to her sick grandmother. Finally, he visits her grandmother, who tells him that she is in excellent health and that his wife has not visited in over a month.

The film then cuts to Mary (Aliki Vougiouklaki) who is practicing dance steps with her maid and sings about looking forward to her outing that night. Michalis' wife, Lilly (Maro Kontou) arrives and thanks Mary for letting her borrow her car, and apologises for scratching it; Lilly confides in Mary that she was just on a date. Nikos (Alekos Alexandrakis), Mary's husband and Michalis' colleague, arrives home, and is greeted by Mary and Lilly, the latter of which explains that she was waiting for Mary who has just returned from a car trip. Mary goes along with the lie so as not to expose her friend's infidelity.

As Mary and Nikos get ready for their outing that night, they notice that the car is not just scratched, but has been in a crash; Mary panics and builds on the lie, claiming that she omitted describing the accident earlier so as not to worry Nikos.

While out with Nikos, they are joined by Takis (Giorgos Pantzas), Nikos' friend and lawyer. Mary feels uncomfortable lying to Nikos and is about to come clean, when Takis brings up a recent divorce case he worked on, and Nikos agrees that once a man knows his wife can lie to him, he will no longer trust her, prompting Mary to keep quiet.

The following day, a stranger visits Mary at home, claiming that Mary hit her dog with her car and demanding compensation, further blackmailing Mary when she sees that the man in the car was not Mary's husband; Mary gets money from Nikos to pay her off. After the woman leaves, a wallet is found belonging to a man. Mary claims that the woman may have dropped it. A police officer also drops by the house and summons Mary to court for the traffic accident.

At court, Takis arrives to represent Mary. While waiting for Mary's case to be heard, Takis and Nikos go for coffee, and Mary strikes a conversation with a man in the courtroom. Another woman interrupts jealously, saying that the man is her lover. Mary's case is called while Takis is still having coffee, and without her lawyer present, Mary makes a negative first impression with the judge. The woman from the courtroom is bringing a claim against Mary for the traffic accident, and her lover is also her lawyer. 

A police officer corroborates the woman's claim, saying that he saw Mary speed past him with a man in her car, giving him a rude gesture as she did so. A vision-impaired tavern owner also puts Mary and a young man at the scene. The blackmailing woman, who turns out to be a con artist who fakes accidents involving her dog so people pay her compensation, was also in court that day, and also chimes in from the gallery that she saw Mary at the scene. Takis, who arrives from his coffee break, notes that they found a wallet she dropped; the man it belongs to turns out to be the claimant's lawyer, and the witnesses confirm they saw him in the car with Mary.

Mary calls Lilly as a witness, who confesses to borrowing Mary's car and causing a traffic accident. However, the other witnesses double down on their assertions that Mary was the person they saw in the car, and Takis says that he cannot argue in the face of the facts presented by these witnesses. The judge finds Mary guilty and excuses Lilly for her perceived perjury, expressing admiration for her willingness to take the fall for her friend.

Nikos too believes that his wife was unfaithful, and initially refuses to pay Mary's fine, so Mary spends the day in a holding cell, where the other inmates sing to cheer her up. Nikos returns to pay the fine, and is angry to find Mary singing with the prisoners.

At home, Nikos says that Mary's supposed infidelity relieves him of the guilt he felt about his own. He reveals that during a work trip to Salonika four months ago, he stayed 12 extra nights not to work, but to lay with another woman. The couple argue and sleep in separate rooms. Mary has a dream (shown through rainbow colours in an otherwise black and white movie) where she tries to dance with Nikos but is interrupted by another woman as other women laugh at her.

Michalis confronts Nikos at work about Lilly's testimony, and Nikos reassures him that Lilly lied to protect Mary. Michalis confronts Lilly at home, who claims the same thing, but Michalis is unsatisfied with inconsistencies in Lilly's account.

Mary learns that there is a photographer stationed outside the tavern where Lilly and the man were spotted, and could prove her innocence if he took a picture of the couple. Lilly recalls the same, and calls the man asking him to find the picture. Mary and the man both drive to the tavern, pursued by their respective significant others. Mary and the man arrive at the same time, and photographer confirms that he did take a picture of the couple, but that another man already bought it from him earlier that day. Mary offers the photographer double if he can find the film and make another print. Nikos, seeing Mary and the man together by the photographer, feels that his suspicions are confirmed and drives off. The woman, on the other hand, gets out of her car and throws rocks at the man.

Mary arrives home, and does not tell Nikos where she has been in an effort to make him jealous. Takis arrives as Nikos' divorce attorney, Nikos having instructed him to produce divorce papers at speed. Takis asserts that he could represent both parties at divorce proceedings, and Mary requests a private conversation with him as her purported lawyer. Mary flirts with Takis, so when Nikos comes in to check on them, he finds Takis in a compromising position. Nikos angrily asserts that Takis agreed to expedite the divorce proceedings so that Mary would be an unmarried woman and Takis could make his move. Takis asks Mary to explain the situation, and echoing Takis' ineffective assistance at her court hearing, Mary says that she cannot argue in the face of the facts presented by Nikos. 

Nikos fires Takis, and says that he needs to pack for a trip to get away from Mary. Mary echoes this statement and goes to pack as Nikos answers a call at the door. Nikos is visited by Michalis, who bought the exculpatory photograph and explains that he overhead his wife calling the man asking him to collect it, and he managed to get there first.

Mary arrives with two suitcases, ready to leave, and is disappointed that Nikos does not try to stop her from leaving. Nikos instead offers to take her bags to the car, and come along for the drive so he can bring the car back from the airport. During the drive, Mary reasserts her innocence, saying she has photographic proof that she was not driving the car that day. Nikos adamantly refuses to see it and says it will not change his mind. He then reveals that he has already seen the photograph and believes that she was faithful; the two kiss in the car, blocking traffic.

Cast

Alekos Alexandrakis as Nikos Diamantidis
Giorgos Pantzas as Takis Maragkakis
Giorgos Konstantinou as Mihalis Haridimos
Dionysis Papagiannopoulos as a judge chief
Vasilis Avlonitis as Nikolaos Spanovangelodimitris-Gylos
Aliki Vougiouklaki as Mary Diamantidou
Maro Kontou as Lilly Haridimou
Kaiti Lambropoulou as Aikaterini Toufexi
Alkis Giannakas as Pakis P
Tasos Giannopoulos as Evangelos Fanouridos (police traffic officer)
Thodoros Katsadramis as Spyros
Kostas Papahristos as a warden
Giorgos Velentzas as a photographer
Costas Hajihristos as an organist
Joly Garbi as Evterpi Karavangeli
Kleo Skouloudi as Kalliopi
Montage: Aristidis Karydis-Fuchs

Music
Songwriter: Alekos Sakellarios
Songs sung by: Trio Athene
Bouzouki solo: Giorgos Zambetas

Reception
Total number of tickets: 515,625

References

External links 

 I soferina at cine.gr
 

1964 comedy films
1960s Greek-language films
1964 films
Greek comedy films